Hollingshead (or Holinshed) is a surname that may refer to:

 Raphael Holinshed (1529–1580), 16th century British author of Holinshed's Chronicles
 Gordon Hollingshead (1892–1952), American movie producer
 John Hollingshead (1827–1904) English theatrical impresario
 Holly Hollingshead (1853–1926), American baseball player
 Richard Hollingshead (1900–1975), American inventor
 Harry Hollingshead (1915-?), Australian rules footballer
 Greg Hollingshead (b. 1947), Canadian novelist
 Megan Hollingshead (b. 1968), American theatre and voice actor
 Iain Hollingshead (b. 1980), British freelance journalist and novelist
 Michael Hollingshead (b. ?), British scientist
 Mike Hollingshead (b. ?), American stormchaser
 Tam Hollingshead (b. ?), American football coach
 Vanessa Hollingshead (b. ?), American comedian
 James Hollingshead (b. March 17, 1989 (age 33 years)), British professional bodybuilder

See also
 Hollings (disambiguation)